Eric Michael Swalwell (born November 16, 1980) is an American lawyer and politician serving as the U.S. representative for California's 14th congressional district since 2023. His district, numbered as the 15th district from 2013 to 2023, covers most of eastern Alameda County and part of central Contra Costa County. He is a member of the Democratic Party.

Born in Sac City, Iowa, Swalwell spent his childhood in Dublin, California. He was a first-generation college student, having briefly attended Campbell University on a soccer scholarship before earning degrees from the University of Maryland, College Park and the University of Maryland, Baltimore. As a college student, Swalwell served as a student liaison to the College Park City Council and interned for Ellen Tauscher.

After college, Swalwell returned to California and worked as a deputy district attorney in Alameda County. He was appointed to multiple municipal commissions in Dublin and later served two years on the Dublin City Council. He was elected to the U.S. House of Representatives in 2012, defeating 40-year incumbent Pete Stark in an upset.

Swalwell has co-chaired the House Democratic Steering Committee since 2017. He was a candidate in the 2020 Democratic Party presidential primaries from April to July 2019 before dropping out and endorsing Joe Biden.

Early life and education 
Swalwell was born on November 16, 1980, in Sac City, Iowa. He is the oldest of four sons of Eric Nelson Swalwell and Vicky Joe Swalwell, both of whom are Republicans. During his early childhood, his father served as police chief in Algona, Iowa. After leaving Iowa, the family eventually settled in Dublin, California. He graduated from Wells Middle School and then from Dublin High School in 1999. As a child, Swalwell suffered from Bell's palsy and worried the paralysis would never go away. To treat the condition, he had to wear an eyepatch.

Swalwell attended Campbell University in North Carolina on a soccer scholarship from 1999 to 2001. He broke both his thumbs during his second year in 2001, ending the scholarship. Swalwell then transferred to the University of Maryland, College Park, where he received a Bachelor of Arts in government and politics in 2003. He then received a Juris Doctor from the University of Maryland Francis King Carey School of Law in 2006.

At the University of Maryland, Swalwell served as Vice President of Campus Affairs for the Student Government Association and was an elected member of the Student-Faculty-Staff University Senate and of its executive committee. He was an active member of the Alpha Sigma Phi fraternity. He often organized protests at the Maryland State House and served as a student liaison to the College Park City Council; the latter appointment inspired other college towns to consider similar arrangements.

Early political career 
In 2001 and 2002, Swalwell worked as an unpaid intern for U.S. representative Ellen Tauscher, who represented . He focused on legislative research and constituent outreach and services. The September 11 terrorist attacks occurred during his internship, inspiring him to public service. The attacks also inspired his first legislative achievement: using his Student Government Association position at the University of Maryland to create a public–private college scholarship program for students who lost parents in the attacks.

After graduating from law school, Swalwell returned to California and worked as a deputy district attorney in Alameda County. He served on the Dublin Heritage & Cultural Arts Commission from 2006 to 2008 and on the Dublin Planning Commission from 2008 to 2010 before winning election to the Dublin City Council in 2010. While he was running for the U.S. Congress, an anonymous group attempted to recall Swalwell from the city council, but the effort was later abandoned.

U.S. House of Representatives

Elections

2012 

In September 2011, Swalwell filed to run for Congress in California's 15th district. The district had previously been the 13th, represented by 20-term incumbent Democrat Pete Stark. Swalwell took a leave of absence from the Dublin City Council to run for the seat.

Swalwell was able to contest Stark only in the general election because of California's "top two" primary system put in place by Proposition 14. Under that system, the top two primary vote-getters advance to the general election, regardless of party affiliation. In the June primary, Stark finished first with 41.8% of the vote, Swalwell placed second with 36%, and independent candidate Chris Pareja third with 22.2%.

In the November general election, the San Francisco Chronicle endorsed Swalwell. During the 2012 election cycle, the Stark campaign accused Swalwell of being a Tea Party candidate. The accusation was denied by Swalwell and dismissed by the San Jose Mercury News, which also endorsed Swalwell. Stark refused to debate Swalwell during the campaign. In response, Swalwell organized a mock debate with an actor playing Stark, quoting him verbatim when answering the moderator. Other campaign gimmicks included rubber ducks that stood in for rubber chickens and suggested that Stark was too "chicken" to debate. Stark pointed out that the ducks were made in China and criticized Swalwell for not "buying American".

Swalwell defeated Stark, 52.1% to 47.9%.

2014 

Swalwell was challenged by Republican Hugh Bussell, a senior manager at Workday, Inc., and by Democratic State Senate Majority Leader Ellen Corbett of Hayward. Corbett, placed third in June's primary, not earning enough votes to make the general election. Swalwell defeated Bussell in the November general election, 69.8% to 30.2%. He was sworn into his second term on January 3, 2015.

2016 

Swalwell was challenged by Republican Danny Reid Turner of Livermore. He defeated Turner in the November general election, 73.8% to 26.2%. He was sworn into his third term on January 3, 2017.

2018 

Swalwell was challenged by Republican Rudy Peters of Livermore. He defeated Peters in the November general election, 73.0% to 27.0%. He was sworn into his fourth term on January 3, 2019.

2020 

Swallwell won the 2020 election against Republican challenger Alison Hayden, 70.9% to 29.1%.

Tenure 
In the House, Swalwell has become known for innovative and extensive use of social media to connect with constituents. In April 2016, The Hill dubbed him "the Snapchat king of Congress", and he used Facebook Live and Periscope to broadcast House Democrats' gun-violence sit-in in June 2016. Swalwell later called for new policies regarding cameras on the House floor.

Swalwell is only the third person to represent his district and its predecessors since 1945. George P. Miller held the seat from 1945 to 1973; Stark won it after unseating Miller in the 1972 Democratic primary.

In his first term, Swalwell served on the House Committee on Homeland Security and the House Committee on Science, Space and Technology. He helped lead the fight against Transportation Security Administration administrator John S. Pistole's decision to lift the ban on pocketknives at airport security; the decision eventually was reversed.

Soon after taking office, Swalwell helped establish the United Solutions Caucus, a bipartisan group of freshman House members who met regularly to discuss areas of agreement.

During a House vote on June 18, 2013, Swalwell used his mobile phone to record a video of his vote against a bill that would ban abortions after 20 weeks (the video was a six-second clip of him pressing the "nay" button on the electronic voting machine) and uploaded it to Vine, an internet video service. House rules bar "the use of mobile electronic devices that impair decorum" and provide that "No device may be used for still photography or for audio or video recording." Swalwell defended the action, saying, "We operate under rules that were created in the 18th century, and I think it's time that the Congress start to act more like regular Americans do. I did not see this as impairing the decorum. I think what this did was highlight, for all to see, the democratic process."

On December 12, 2013, Swalwell introduced the Philippines Charitable Giving Assistance Act into the House. The bill allowed Americans to deduct from their 2013 taxes any charitable donations made between January 1 and April 15, 2014, for the relief of victims in the Republic of the Philippines of Typhoon Haiyan. The typhoon caused an estimated $1 billion in damage and killed thousands of people. Swalwell said, "Typhoon Haiyan devastated many parts of the Philippines and we should make it as easy as possible for Americans who want to assist those affected by the storm." Swalwell saw the bill as providing "another incentive for Americans to donate and donate now—when their help is needed most". On March 25, 2014, President Barack Obama signed this legislation into law.

By the end of his first term, Swalwell had gotten three bills through the House and two of them signed into law—more than any other freshman.

In 2014, Swalwell announced that he would serve as chairman of Maryland Governor Martin O'Malley's O' Say Can You See PAC's Young Professionals Leadership Circle due to his friendship with O'Malley. Although he made clear that his support was about the 2014 midterm elections and not an endorsement of a potential presidential bid by O'Malley in 2016, Swalwell endorsed O'Malley for president in July 2015.

During his second term, Swalwell served on the United States House Permanent Select Committee on Intelligence, and as ranking member of its Central Intelligence Agency Subcommittee. He also retained his seat on the United States House Committee on Science, Space, and Technology.

In April 2015, Swalwell founded Future Forum, a group of young House Democrats focused on the concerns of millennials. A year later, Swalwell said that in the meetings the groups had held at places like college campuses and startups, participants had brought up student loan debt as their most pressing concern. At the time, Swalwell himself still carried almost $100,000 in debt from his undergraduate and law-school education.

In May 2015, Swalwell and Representative Darrell Issa launched the bipartisan Sharing Economy Caucus to explore how this burgeoning new economic sector can benefit more Americans.

In February 2016, Democratic Leader Nancy Pelosi elevated Swalwell to vice-chair of the Democratic Steering and Policy Committee, which sets the Democratic policy agenda and nominates Democratic members for committee assignments.

In December 2016, Swalwell was named the co-chair of House Democratic Steering Committee, replacing Donna Edwards and serving with Rosa DeLauro. He now co-chairs the committee with Barbara Lee and Cheri Bustos.

Swalwell also retained his seat on the United States House Permanent Select Committee on Intelligence but left the United States House Committee on Science, Space, and Technology to serve on the United States House Committee on the Judiciary, and its Subcommittee on Courts, the Internet, and Intellectual Property, and Subcommittee on Regulatory Reform, Commercial and Antitrust Law.

In December 2016, Swalwell and Representative Elijah Cummings introduced the Protecting Our Democracy Act, which would create an independent, bipartisan commission to investigate foreign interference in the 2016 election. They reintroduced the legislation for the 115th Congress in January 2017, but it failed to win any meaningful bipartisan support. The bill was widely seen as unnecessarily duplicative given the then ongoing Mueller special counsel investigation, as well as multiple existing committee investigations in Congress. Swalwell's bill attracted support along strictly partisan lines, except for two Republicans, and ultimately failed to reach a vote in the United States House Committee on Foreign Affairs. He remained a constant presence on national news networks throughout 2017, voicing his views on the investigations.

Given Swalwell's position on the House Intelligence Committee, he played a role in investigating the purported links between Trump associates and Russian officials during his third term, saying, "[i]t's always smelled like collusion."

In 2018, the U.S. Department of Justice under the Trump administration seized Swalwell's personal data. The record seizure also targeted Adam Schiff, who chairs the House Intelligence Committee.

On March 5, 2021, Swalwell filed a civil lawsuit against Donald Trump, Donald Trump Jr., Representative Mo Brooks, and Rudy Giuliani, seeking damages for their alleged role in inciting the January 6 attack on the Capitol.

As of October 2021, Swalwell had voted in line with Joe Biden's stated position 100% of the time.

In January 2023, Speaker Kevin McCarthy expelled Swalwell and Adam Schiff from the House Intelligence Committee.

Contact with suspected Chinese spy 

In December 2020, Swalwell was named in an Axios story about suspected Chinese spy Fang Fang or Christine Fang, who had since at least 2012 been cultivating contacts with California politicians who the Chinese government believed had promising futures in politics. Axios reported that Fang participated in fundraising for Swalwell's 2014 congressional election bid, met Swalwell at events, and helped place an intern inside his congressional office. Swalwell ended ties with Fang in 2015 after U.S. intelligence briefed him and top members of Congress on concerns that Chinese agents were attempting to infiltrate Congress. Axios reported that Swalwell was not accused of any impropriety and that officials did not believe that Fang obtained classified information from her contacts. Also in December 2020, the San Francisco Chronicle quoted an unnamed FBI official familiar with the investigation as saying that "Swalwell was completely cooperative and under no suspicion of wrongdoing".

In March 2021, House Minority Leader Kevin McCarthy moved to remove Swalwell from his seat on the House Intelligence Committee, which was tabled 218–200–3 on a party-line vote. Swalwell suggested that someone in the Trump administration may have leaked the information to the press, as he had been a vocal critic of Trump and served on two committees involved in Trump's impeachment.

The December 2020 Axios story said Fang had had sexual relations with two unidentified Midwestern mayors, but not with Swalwell, though allegations persisted he was a national security threat by being associated with Fang. Since the report, Swalwell has received death and rape threats against him and his family. After McCarthy became Speaker in January 2023, he announced he would remove Swalwell from the Intelligence committee, saying, "If you got the briefing I got from the FBI, you wouldn't have Swalwell on any committee." Swalwell characterized McCarthy's action as "purely vengeance". Intelligence Committee members are term-limited and Swalwell's membership expired in January 2023.

Committee assignments 
 Permanent Select Committee on Intelligence (until January 24, 2023)
 Subcommittee on Intelligence Modernization and Readiness (Chair)
 Subcommittee on Strategic Technologies and Advanced Research
 Committee on the Judiciary
 Subcommittee on Courts, the Internet, and Intellectual Property
 Subcommittee on Regulatory Reform, Commercial and Antitrust Law
 Committee on Homeland Security

Caucus memberships 
 House Democratic Steering Committee (co-chair)
American Sikh Congressional Caucus
 Congressional Asian Pacific American Caucus
 Congressional LGBT Equality Caucus
 Blue Collar Caucus

2020 presidential campaign 

On April 8, 2019, Swalwell announced his candidacy for president on The Late Show with Stephen Colbert. He also released a campaign ad announcing his campaign on his social media pages. Swalwell said that gun control would be the primary focus of his campaign. He made a formal announcement at Dublin High School on April 14, 2019.

Swalwell participated in one presidential debate. During the debate, he commented that he was six years old when Joe Biden spoke of passing the torch to a younger generation. Swalwell's polling average never rose above 1%. On July 8, 2019, he withdrew from the race. At the time, he was at risk of not qualifying for the second set of debates.

Endorsements

Political positions 
Swalwell has called for greater authenticity from politicians, saying that they should not insult each other publicly and then expect to have friendly relationships "backstage", and comparing some politicians' behavior to a fake, entertainment-focused professional wrestling show. He has proposed the idea of a "mobile Congress", with members casting votes remotely while spending more time in their districts.

Domestic policy 
Swalwell advocated the repeal of the No Child Left Behind Act, and increasing funding for education, while decreasing funding for defense. He also advocated creating renewable energy jobs with federal stimulus money. He said he would attempt to raise the cap on the Social Security payroll tax (which applies to annual earnings only up to $110,000 ), so that wealthier Americans would pay more into the program.

In March 2013, Swalwell led the writing of an open letter to John S. Pistole, administrator of the Transportation Security Administration (TSA), opposing a new policy that would allow passengers to bring knives onto airplanes. He supports same-sex marriage and is pro-choice. Swalwell opposed the overturning of Roe v. Wade in Dobbs v. Jackson Women's Health Organization and called it "an attack on everyone's freedom" and "government-mandated pregnancy".

In 2022, Swalwell was one of 16 Democrats to vote against the Merger Filing Fee Modernization Act of 2022, an antitrust package that would crack down on corporations for anti-competitive behavior.

Foreign policy 
In 2017, Swalwell co-sponsored the Israel Anti-Boycott Act, a House bill designed to allow U.S. states to enact laws requiring contractors to sign pledges promising not to boycott any goods from Israel and Israeli-occupied territories or their contracts would be terminated.

In 2019, Swalwell criticized Trump's trade war against China. He condemned the 2019 Turkish offensive into northeastern Syria and called for possibly suspending Turkey's membership in NATO.

In March 2022, Swalwell proposed the following measures in response to the Russian invasion of Ukraine on CNN: "Frankly, I think closing their embassy in the United States, kicking every Russian student out of the United States, those should all be on the table, and Putin needs to know that every day that he is in Ukraine, there are more severe options that could come." He received some backlash for his remarks, but defended his stance on Twitter. Others proposed expelling only those students who are part of the Russian ruling elite's families that espouse anti-Western rhetoric while sending their children to live there.

Personal life 
Swalwell and his first wife are divorced. He married his second wife, Brittany Ann Watts, a sales director at the Ritz-Carlton in Half Moon Bay, in October 2016. They have a son, born in 2017, and a daughter, born in 2018. A third child was born in 2021.

In 2020, Swalwell purchased a home for $1.2 million in Eckington, Washington, D.C.

Electoral history

References

External links 

 Congressman Eric Swalwell official U.S. House website
 Swalwell for Congress campaign website
 
 

|-

|-

|-

1980 births
Candidates in the 2020 United States presidential election
American prosecutors
California city council members
Campbell University alumni
Living people
Maryland city council members
Democratic Party members of the United States House of Representatives from California
People from Dublin, California
People from Sac City, Iowa
San Francisco Bay Area politicians
University of Maryland Francis King Carey School of Law alumni
University of Maryland, College Park alumni
American gun control activists
Gun politics in the United States
Members of the United States Congress stripped of committee assignment